Dubawi (foaled 7 February 2002) is a retired Thoroughbred racehorse and active sire.

Background
Dubawi is a bay horse with no white markings bred in Ireland by Sheikh Mohammed's Darley Stud. He was one of the only crop of foals sired by Dubai Millennium, an outstanding racehorse. His dam, Zomaradah was a top class racemare who won the Oaks d'Italia, E. P. Taylor Stakes, Premio Lydia Tesio and the Royal Whip Stakes. As a descendant of the broodmare Sunbittern, Zomaradah, who also produced the Lancashire Oaks winner Emirates Queen, was closely related to In the Wings, High-Rise and Virginia Waters. The colt raced in the blue colours of Godolphin and was trained by Saeed bin Suroor. He was ridden in all but one of his races by Frankie Dettori.

Racing career
Dubawi was undefeated as a two-year-old in 2004. He won a maiden race at Goodwood Racecourse in June, the Group Three Superlative Stakes at Newmarket in July and the Group One National Stakes at the Curragh in September.

In the following year he started favourite for the 2000 Guineas at Newmarket but finished fifth behind Footstepsinthesand. He defeated Oratorio in the Irish 2000 Guineas and then moved up in distance to finish third to Motivator in The Derby. He returned to one mile to win the Prix Jacques Le Marois at Deauville Racecourse in August and ended his career by finishing second to Starcraft in the Queen Elizabeth II Stakes at Ascot a month later.

Stud record
Dubawi stands as a breeding stallion at his owner's Dalham Hall Stud at a fee of £350,000 for the 2023 season.

Notable stock

c = colt, f = filly, g = gelding

National Hunt
Dubawi sired Dodging Bullets, a top class 2 mile chaser who won the Grade I Tingle Creek Chase, Grade I Clarence House Chase and the Grade I Queen Mother Champion Chase at the Cheltenham Festival, winning all three Grade Ones in the 2014–2015 Great Britain National Hunt Season. Dodging Bullets was bred by acclaimed flat jockey Frankie Dettori, having originally been bred as an Epsom Derby prospect. Dubawi's first Grade I success in the National Hunt sphere came when Hisaabaat won the Champion Four Year Old Hurdle at the 2012 Punchestown Festival.

Pedigree

References

2002 racehorse births
Racehorses trained in the United Kingdom
Racehorses bred in Ireland
Racehorses trained in the United Arab Emirates
Irish Classic Race winners
Thoroughbred family 9-e